Dithryca guttulosa is a species of tephritid or fruit flies in the genus Dithryca of the family Tephritidae.

Distribution
Spain, Portugal.

References

Tephritinae
Insects described in 1869
Diptera of Europe